Jason Cadieux is a Canadian film, television and stage actor. He is best known for his performance in the 1996 film Lilies, for which he was nominated for the Genie Award for Best Actor at the 17th Genie Awards.

Career 
Cadieux's other credits have included the films Iron Eagle on the Attack, Sins of Silence and Joe's So Mean to Josephine, the television series Family Passions and Deepwater Black, and stage productions of Brad Fraser's Poor Super Man and Sky Gilbert's Play Murder and Bad Acting Teachers at Buddies in Bad Times. He has also written a number of stage plays, including Unleavable, Hard Ways, Somnambulists in Love and 17.5.

Personal life 
Originally from Toronto, Ontario, Cadieux moved to Niagara Region in 1998. He and actor and playwright Stephanie Jones co-founded and continue to run the Essential Collective Theatre company in St. Catharines.

Filmography

Film

Television

References

External links

Canadian male film actors
Canadian male television actors
Canadian male stage actors
20th-century Canadian dramatists and playwrights
21st-century Canadian dramatists and playwrights
Living people
Male actors from Ontario
People from St. Catharines
Writers from Ontario
Canadian male dramatists and playwrights
20th-century Canadian male writers
21st-century Canadian male writers
Year of birth missing (living people)